JD Asia No 1. Warehouse is a fully automatic warehouse operated by robot by created by JD.com. The warehouse is located in Shanghai.

References

Buildings and structures in Shanghai
Logistics
JD.com
Warehouses in China